It's Okay to Not Be Okay is a 2020 South Korean television series written by Jo Yong and directed by Park Shin-woo. It stars Kim Soo-hyun, Seo Yea-ji, Oh Jung-se and Park Gyu-young. The series follows Ko Moon-young, an antisocial children's book writer who moves to her hometown to pursue her love interest Moon Gang-tae, a psych ward caretaker, who has been dedicating his life to taking care of his autistic older brother Moon Sang-tae.

The series broadcast for 16 episodes on tvN and Netflix from June 20, 2020, to August 9, 2020. According to Nielsen Korea, it recorded an average nationwide TV viewership rating of 5.4%. It was the most popular show of 2020 in the romance genre on Netflix in South Korea. Critical response were primarily positive; some commentators criticized the writing in the latter half of the series but praised the acting by the cast.

The New York Times named It's Okay to Not Be Okay one of "The Best International Shows of 2020". At the 57th Baeksang Arts Awards, it received eight nominations with two wins (Best Supporting Actor – Television and Technical Award for costume design). It received a nomination at the 49th International Emmy Awards in the Best TV Movie or Miniseries categories.

Plot
Moon Gang-tae lives with his older brother Moon Sang-tae who is autistic. They frequently move from town to town ever since Sang-tae witnessed their mother's murder. Gang-Tae works as a caregiver in a psychiatric ward at every place they settle in. While working in a hospital, he meets a famous children's book writer, Ko Moon-young, who is rumored to have antisocial personality disorder.

Circumstances lead Gang-tae to work at the OK Psychiatric Hospital in the fictional Seongjin City, the same city where they all lived when they were young. Meanwhile, Moon-young forms a romantic obsession for Gang-tae after finding out that their pasts overlap. She follows him to Seongjin, where the trio (including Sang-tae) slowly begins to heal each other's emotional wounds. They unravel many secrets, seek comfort from each other and move forward in their lives.

Cast members

Main
 Kim Soo-hyun as Moon Gang-tae
 Moon Woo-jin as young Moon Gang-tae
 An orphaned caregiver working at OK Psychiatric Hospital. While he is empathetic to everyone around him, he struggles with self-esteem as a result of his past experiences and avoids having close relationships with anyone other than his older brother.
 Seo Yea-ji as Ko Moon-young
 Kim Soo-in as young Ko Moon-young
 A popular children's book author with antisocial personality disorder. She had a troubled childhood and a turbulent relationship with her parents. She develops a romantic obsession over Gang-tae after a coincidental encounter and often goes to extreme lengths to get his attention.
 Oh Jung-se as Moon Sang-tae
 Lee Kyu-sung as young Moon Sang-tae
 Moon Gang-tae's older brother, who is autistic. He is a fan of Moon-young, as well as an aspiring illustrator. He was the sole witness of his mother's murder, which resulted in his irrational fear of butterflies, as they reminded him of this traumatic experience. His fear develops into nightmares every spring, and forces Gang-tae to move towns with him in order to "run away from the butterflies".
Park Gyu-young as Nam Ju-ri
 Park Seo-kyung as young Nam Ju-ri
 A nurse and Gang-tae's co-worker at OK Psychiatric Hospital. She has an unrequited crush on Gang-tae, and is shown to be shy and easily jealous of others who are close with her romantic interests. She dislikes Moon-young, with whom she had a brief friendship in elementary school.

Supporting

SangsangESang Publishing Company
 Kim Joo-hun as Lee Sang-in
 The CEO of SangsangESang Publishing Company, which publishes Moon-young's children's books.

 Park Jin-joo as Yoo Seung-jae
 The art director at SangsangESang Publishing Company who assists Sang-in.

OK Psychiatric Hospital Officials
 Kim Chang-wan as Oh Ji-wang
 The director of OK Psychiatric Hospital. Despite his use of unconventional methods, he genuinely cares about his patients and often succeeds at helping them get better.

 Kim Mi-kyung as Kang Soon-deok
 A skilled chef at the hospital and Ju-ri's mother.

 Jang Young-nam as Park Haeng-ja
 The head nurse of the hospital. She is later revealed to be Do Hui-jae, the mother of Ko Moon-young, in disguise.

 Jang Gyu-ri as Sun Byul
 A nurse with three years of experience who is Ju-ri's co-worker and friend.

 Seo Joon as Kwon Min-seok
 A psychiatrist at the hospital.

 Choi Woo-sung as Oh Cha-yong
 A young and careless caregiver who often sleeps at work. He is the son of hospital director Oh Ji-wang.

OK Psychiatric Hospital Patients
  as Ko Dae-hwan
 Moon-young's father, who is a patient at the hospital. He suffers from dementia and is bedbound. He was an architect who designed the Ko's family house, which is nicknamed the "Cursed Castle" after his wife Do Hui-jae's disappearance.

  as Kan Pil-ong
 A kind-hearted yet troubled Vietnam War veteran who suffers from post-traumatic stress disorder.

 Jung Jae-kwang as Joo Jeong-tae
 A patient content with life who was originally admitted to the hospital for alcoholism. He is the boyfriend of Lee Ah-reum.

  as Lee Ah-reum
 A shy patient who was admitted for anxiety after escaping from her abusive ex-husband. She is the girlfriend of Joo Jeong-tae.

 Kang Ji-eun as Park Ok-ran
 A mysterious fan of Hui-jae who torments Dae-hwan.

 Joo In-young as Yoo Sun-hae
 Ko Do-yeon as young Sun-hae (Ep. 13)
 A patient with dissociative identity disorder that she developed as a coping mechanism because of the troubled relationship with her father.

Others
 Kang Ki-doong as Jo Jae-soo
Moon Gang-tae's best friend, who follows him and Sang-tae whenever they move.

Choi Hee-jin as Moon Sang-tae and Moon Gang-tae's mother
 A single parent murdered over a decade ago under mysterious circumstances.

  / Jang Young-nam as Do Hui-jae
A best-selling novelist and Moon-young's mother. She was emotionally abusive to Moon-young and is a big part of the reason why she is the way she is. She disappeared under mysterious circumstances over a decade before Moon-young meets Gang-tae again.

Special appearances
 Kwak Dong-yeon as Kwon Ki-do (Ep. 3–4, 16)
 A patient at the hospital diagnosed with mania, who is the son of an assemblyman.
 Bae Hae-sun as Kang Eun-ja (Ep. 4–7, 16)
 A patient at the hospital diagnosed with psychotic depression, which she developed after losing her daughter to a car accident.
 Jung Sang-hoon as a love motel owner (Ep. 5)
 Choi Daniel as CEO Choi Daniel, who is a fan of Ko Moon-young (Ep. 8)

Production
It's Okay to Not Be Okay was created by Studio Dragon, written by Jo Yong, directed by Park Shin-woo, and produced by Story TV and Gold Medalist. Jo Yong based the drama on her relationship with a man who had a personality disorder. She developed Moon Sang-tae's character by listening to the stories of people with autistic brothers and referred to the books recommended by the CEO of Bear Better, a social enterprise where people with developmental disabilities work. Fashion director Cho Sang-kyung managed costumes, while fashion designer Minju Kim designed some of Ko Moon-young's dresses.

In the second half of 2019, Kim Soo-hyun considered It's Okay to Not Be Okay to be his comeback drama following his obligatory military enlistment, and his casting was confirmed by his agency in February 2020. At the press conference for the drama he said that he joined the project after being drawn to its title and Moon Gang-tae's character. In the same month, Seo Yea-ji was confirmed to be cast as Ko Moon-young. In March 2020, veteran actor Oh Jung-se accepted the role of Moon Sang-tae; when asked about his character at the press conference, he commented that "autism isn't an illness, but something you're born with".

The first script reading photos were released on May 8, 2020, and filming was completed on July 31, 2020, without a wrap party out of concerns for the COVID-19 pandemic. Filming locations for the drama included Cafe Sanida in Wonju, Gangwon, which provided the background for the "cursed castle", completed with CGI effects, and Secret Blue Cafe in Goseong County, Gangwon, which was transformed into OK Psychiatric Hospital for the shooting using props. Outside locations included streets and beaches in Goseong, as well as locations in Yangju (Gyeonggi) and Incheon. Some of the furniture used in the drama were antiques and 100 to 200 years old.

It's Okay to Not Be Okay was broadcast on tvN on Saturdays and Sundays at 9:00 pm Korea Standard Time (KST) from June 20, 2020, to August 9, 2020; episodes were released on Netflix in South Korea and internationally after their television broadcast.

Media

Tie-in literature
The five children's storybooks that appeared in the drama were written by Jo Yong and illustrated by concept artist Jamsan. They were published in Korean by Wisdom House in July and August 2020. According to the Kyobo Book Centre and YES 24, all five books were listed in the top 20 bestselling books of the month. Due to its popularity Kyobo Book Centre recorded a ninefold increase in the number of drama- and film-related books. In 2021, all five books were translated by Woo Jae-Hyung into Brazilian Portuguese and published by Intrínseca in March and May.

The series' script, also illustrated by Jamsan, was published in two books; each covers eight episodes.

Soundtrack

It's Okay to Not Be Okay soundtrack album executively written by music director Nam Hye-seung was digitally released on August 9, 2021. It contains 16 songs (including singles) and 20 score pieces from the series. It features vocal performances from Janet Suhh, Heize, Sam Kim, Park Won, Lee Su-hyun, Kim Feel, Cheeze, Yongzoo and Elaine. Pre-orders for the physical version began on August 5, and was officially released on August 13.
The physical version debuted at number fourteen on the weekly Gaon Album Chart for the week ending August 15, and peaked at number ten the following week.

Tracklist

Singles

Reception

Commercial performance
According to the big data analytics firm Good Data Corporation, It's Okay to Not Be Okay was the most talked about drama online in South Korea for eight consecutive weeks. It became a hot topic on social media when Oh spent a day with an autistic fan. It also topped CJ E&M and AGB Nielsen Media Research's Content Power Index (CPI) report during its eight-week run with its highest CPI of 373.2 in the first week of August; it was the highest rated tvN drama of 2020 in CPI. Smart Media Rep (SMR), which distributes VoD (video on demand) clips of major broadcasters to online platforms like Naver and YouTube, reported the drama had over 110 million cumulative views as of December 10, 2020. An analysis performed by SMR found that the majority of viewers were in their 20s.

CJ ENM, parent company of tvN, found that operating profits for the third quarter of 2020 increased by 17.9% when compared to the same period of 2019, due to an increase in digital-related sales as a response to the COVID-19 pandemic. Following the popularity of the drama, the outfits worn by Seo Yea-ji garnered attention and raised the profile of Korean fashion designers and brands of earrings, handbag and nightwear. When the soft toys, nightmare doll (Mang-tae) and dinosaur doll that were used in the drama were put on sale, the site quickly sold out.

Critical response
It's Okay to Not Be Okay largely received positive critical feedback, primarily for its unique premise, visual storytelling, acting by the cast and importance given to mental health. Joan MacDonald of Forbes called it "the most visually appealing drama of 2020" and said, "Not only are the actors beautiful, but the drama's graphics, cinematography and costumes are also gorgeous." Contributors to Manila Bulletin considered it "unafraid to introduce fresh elements" with necessary clichés in a romantic K-drama, and praised Moon-young as a "headstrong" and "independent woman". However, when the series debuted, culture critic Chung Deok-hyun was concerned that Moon-young's "exaggerated words and actions" could decrease viewers' immersion in the drama. In the Filipino version of Cosmopolitan, Jacinda A. Lopez found that the "messages the drama was relaying are where the beauty truly lies". Rumaiysa M Rahman of Prothom Alo praised writing that "this drama makes people realise, societies should stop looking at those who seem different."

John Lui and Jan Lee of The Straits Times gave the drama a rating of 3.5/5 stars and said that Kim "pull[ed] off a sensitive portrayal of a young man whose life has been derailed by tragedy". The New York Times''' Mike Hale called Seo's performance "mesmerizing" and made the drama work. S. Poorvaja of The Hindu, praised Moon-Young as a character "excellently played by Seo Yea-ji", but criticized the writing, saying that "the show could have gone into more nuance – especially after the character was marketed as someone having Anti-Social Personality disorder". Poorvaja also said that the show's portrayal of a person with autism spectrum disorder was good, commenting that "Oh Jung-se's Moon Sang-tae is perhaps the show's biggest victory." Edmund Lee from South China Morning Post gave a rating of 3/5 stars, pointing out that the series would disappoint "detective fiction fans" because of the limited explanation of mystery surrounding the murder. Kim Jae-Ha of Teen Vogue described the storyline as "vigorous" and said, "The series finale offers hope and a sense of peace. But it will also make even the most stoic viewers tear up."

Sexually inappropriate scenes
The series was criticized on social media and the Korea Communications Standards Commission received over 50 formal complaints, largely for a scene in which Moon-young overtly stares and touches Gang-tae's body as he gets dressed. In another scene a male character, who suffers from manic depression and exhibitionism, reveals parts of his body, with his genitals being covered by a drawing of an elephant. Some viewers defended these scenes as ways of expressing the characters' personalities.

On August 26, 2020, the broadcast censorship body issued a legal sanction to the television series for sexually inappropriate scenes in episode three, judging it to be against the broadcast deliberation regulations. It cited Article 27, on duties of integrity, and Article 30, on gender equality. The subcommission gave the reasoning: "Even considering the fact that they were meant to exaggeratedly express a character's personality, (the scenes in question) show how insensitive the drama's producers are to gender equality in broadcasting content that may belittle a certain gender and hold the possibility to justify sexual harassment and molestation."

ViewershipIt's Okay to Not Be Okay was the most popular show of 2020 on Netflix in South Korea in its romance genre. It was the most popular Korean drama series on Netflix in Taiwan, and the "most enduring Korean drama" in Malaysia, Philippines, Singapore and Thailand, being in Netflix's top 10 list for more than 100 days. The series was also one of the most popular Korean drama of 2020 on Netflix in Australia, Hong Kong, India, Japan and South Africa.It's Okay to Not Be Okay aired on tvN, which normally has a relatively smaller audience compared to free-to-air TV/public broadcasters (KBS, SBS, MBC and EBS). The series logged 6.1% in viewership for its first episode Saturday but dropped to 4.7% for the next one. The series maintained its ratings in 4-6% range throughout its run, peaking at 7.4% for the last episode, entering the list of highest-rated Korean dramas in cable television history.

Accolades
The magazine Elle'' ranked it #2 on its list of "The 10 Best K-Dramas To Binge-Watch On Netflix".

Notes

References

External links
  
 
 
 

TVN (South Korean TV channel) television dramas
2020 South Korean television series debuts
2020 South Korean television series endings
South Korean romance television series
Korean-language Netflix exclusive international distribution programming
Television series by Studio Dragon
Autism in television
Television about mental health
Television series by Story TV
Television series by Gold Medalist (company)